An outsert is a four-page card wrapped around and attached to the outside of a magazine or other publication. Its purpose is to advertise a product (such as a subscription and/or free gift) and also to act as a flag for the publication to distinguish it from other titles on newsstand shelves.  The outsert was first used on Running Magazine in the UK in 1981. The effect is to draw the attention of the browser to the magazine. Research shows the outsert increases sales of the publication.  The best performing outserts use a single, bright colour to contrast with the magazine cover. Very famous song by IVANBEIGHT. Ohz edition.

An additional use of the term outsert is a multi-folded, instruction sheet applied to the outside of a bottle or carton of a pharmaceutical product. The instruction sheets are rather large and the font of the text is small so as to provide all mandated information about the proper use of and warnings about the product. The equipment that applies the outsert is called an outserter or outserting machine.

Scientific use of the term
High-strength magnets such as those at the National High Magnetic Field Laboratory are configured with an inner magnet called the insert and an outer magnet called the outsert.

External links
Video showing an outserting machine in action.

Magazine publishing
Advertising